Thomas G. Ayers (February 16, 1915 in Detroit, Michigan – June 8, 2007 in Chicago, Illinois) was president (1964–1980), CEO and chairman (1973–1980) of Commonwealth Edison.

Ayers served as chairman of the Board of Trustees of Northwestern University, the Erikson Institute, the Bank Street College of Education in New York City, the Chicago Symphony Orchestra, the Chicago Community Trust, the Chicago Urban League, the Community Renewal Society, the Chicago Association of Commerce and Industry, Chicago United, the Leadership Council for Metropolitan Open Communities, and Dearborn Park Corp., and served as vice president of the Chicago Board of Education.

Ayers also served on the board of directors of Sears, G.D. Searle, Chicago Pacific Corp., Zenith Corp., Northwest Industries, General Dynamics Corp. of St. Louis, First National Bank of Chicago, the Chicago Cubs, and the Tribune Co.

In 1938, he married Mary Andrew, the mother of his children.  His son William Ayers, once the leader of the radical Weather Underground, has been a professor of education at the University of Illinois at Chicago since 1987. His son John Ayers, once on the staff (1983–1986) of former U.S. Rep. Lane Evans (D-IL), is a national leader in charter school development.

References

1915 births
2007 deaths
Philanthropists from Illinois
Businesspeople from Detroit
Businesspeople from Chicago
Exelon people
20th-century American philanthropists
American chief executives
Members of the Chicago Board of Education
20th-century American businesspeople